Gradungula is a monotypic genus of South Pacific large-clawed spiders containing the single species, Gradungula sorenseni. It is only found in New Zealand. 



Etymology
The genus name is derived from Latin  "step" and  "claw", referring to the enlarged front leg claws of this species. These claws also occur in other species of the family Gradungulidae. The species name "sorenseni" is named after Jack Sorensen, the discoverer of the species.

Taxonomy 
Gradungula sorenseni was first described by Raymond Robert Forster in 1955.

Distribution 
Gradungula sorenseni is distributed in forests throughout the western South Island and throughout Stewart Island.

References

Gradungulidae
Monotypic Araneomorphae genera
Spiders of New Zealand
Taxa named by Raymond Robert Forster